Football Club Dordrecht, or simply FC Dordrecht is a professional Dutch association football club based in Dordrecht, a city in the Western Netherlands, located in the province of South Holland. They currently compete in the Eerste Divisie, the second tier of the Dutch football league system.

Originally founded on 16 August 1883 as Dordrechtsche Cricket Club (DCC) which later became Dordrechtse Football Club (DFC), it became a professional club in 1954 upon the introduction of professional football to the Netherlands. In 1972, the professional branch separated from the parent club and continued under the name FC Dordrecht, before becoming DS '79 in 1979. On 1 July 1991, the club merged with SV SVV from Schiedam to become SVV/Dordrecht'90, before becoming Dordrecht '90 the following year. Since 1994, the club has been called FC Dordrecht. A two time KNVB Cup winner, Dordrecht has spent most of its existence as a second-tier Eerste Divisie side, with short stints in the top-tier Eredivisie.

Since 1948, Dordrecht has played its home games at the Stadion Krommedijk (currently known as the Matchoholic Stadion for sponsorship reasons), which saw a major renovation in 1998–99. The stadium has a capacity of 4,235.

History

Beginnings
Founded on 16 August 1883 as the cricket club DCC, the club branched out and added association football club to their club which changed its name to DCFC in 1891, before completely abandoning cricket in 1899 and continuing as DFC. It became a professional club in 1954 upon the introduction of professional football to the Netherlands. The next significant events were in 1972, at which time the professional branch of DFC was renamed FC Dordrecht, and in 1974 when the professionals and amateurs severed their ties.

1979–1990: DS '79
In 1979, under the leadership of chairman and investor Nico de Vries, the organisation was professionalised and an attempt was also made to gain more supporters to the fanbase. This included a new name, DS '79 (Drechtsteden'79), referring to the Drechtsteden region. The club colours were also changed, and red-white colour scheme was replaced by a yellow-blue outfit. New players came to the club, including Huub Smeets who signed from the Los Angeles Aztecs, Wim Berends and Chris Bosse from the Sparta reserve team, and Harry van den Ham and Joop Oostdam from the reserves of FC Utrecht. The team became known as the "local heroes, and popularity grew and increasing interest in the games at Stadion Krommedijk. In January 1981, the most famous player in club history, Johan Cruyff, made three appearances for DS '79. These came at Stamford Bridge against Chelsea (4–2), at home against Ajax (2–1) and in Belgium against Charleroi (1–7).

In 1983, the team won the second-tier Eerste Divisie and as a result, DS '79 won promotion to the Eredivisie. The following season, DS'79 was led by the coaching duo Hans Dorjee and Joop van Daele, and suffered direct relegation to the Eerste Divisie.

At the end of the 1986–87 season, DS '79 won promotion again, this time via play-offs. The yellow-blues were then led by Simon Kistemaker, he neither could prevent the club from Dordrecht from relegating again at the end of the season.

Former player Epi Drost took over the position of head coach at the start of the 1989–90 season, but only managed to lead the team to a 19th and last place in the Eerste Divisie. New investor, Cees den Braven, became chairman in the club and changed the name of the club, its third name: Dordrecht '90. The outfit was also changed to a green jersey with white shorts. These were the colors of De Braven Sealants, the chairman's company. Margo Gerrits signed a contract as commercial manager at Dordrecht '90, making her the first female manager in professional football.

1991–2001: Dordrecht '90
The club just missed promotion to the Eredivisie in 1991. It was finally admitted when Dordrecht '90 surprisingly merged with neighbouring Schiedamse Voetbal Vereniging (SVV) of Schiedam and became SVV/Dordrecht '90. Under the new name, the club immediately returned to the highest level. Under the leadership of Dick Advocaat and Han Berger, the team reached fifteenth place in the league table. That year, the club played its only European matches in the UEFA Intertoto Cup, consisting only of a group stage against Hammarby IF from Sweden, AaB from Denmark and 1. FC Saarbrücken from Germany. The following year, Han Berger and Nico van Zoghel only reached last place in the table, meaning that SVV/Dordrecht '90 suffered another relegation.

After relegation, the club abandoned the 'SVV' and continued as Dordrecht '90. Van Zoghel remained as head coach and led the club to the Eerste Divisie championship at the end of the 1993–94 season with automatic promotion. Again, the Eredivisie was too big of a mouthful for the Dordrecht team, who again relegated directly. Chairman Cees den Braven resigned from the position and handed over the leadership of the club to former referee Frans Derks. Much success was not achieved in the following years, and the club slowly fell to the lower echelons of the Eerste Divisie. A small revival occurred at the end of the 1998–99 season, as Dordrecht '90 qualified for promotion play-offs through a period championship, despite only reaching a 14th place in the table, but did not find success there.

2002–present: FC Dordrecht

Management changes 
Finally in 2002, the club was renamed once again, to the name it bore from 1972 to 1979: FC Dordrecht, which remains the name today. For a number of years, Dordrecht was one of the clubs with the lowest average attendance of all Dutch professional teams.

When at the end of the 2002–03 season, FC Dordrecht ended bottom of the Eerste Divisie, Derks resigned from his position as chairman and Ad Heijsman took over. Heijsman was previously chairman of DFC, the club from which FC Dordrecht originated. Former player Marco Boogers was appointed technical director. After a number of lean years, Dordrecht slowly crept back up from the sporting trough. In 2009 and 2010, head coach Gert Kruys led the team to straight promotion play-off appearances.

With Marco Boogers as technical director of the club, a new direction was initiated. Partly due to the disappointing financial results, the budget for players decreased to €5.5 thousand. FC Dordrecht then began a partnership with Eredivisie club ADO Den Haag, who provided players on one-season loan agreements, including Tom Beugelsdijk, Giovanni Korte and Santy Hulst. Boogers also managed to sign talented players from other clubs, including Joris van Overeem, Marvin Peersman and Jafar Arias.

Eredivisie 2014–15
On 18 May 2014, Dordrecht won promotion to the Eredivisie for the first time in 19 years, after a 3–1 win over Sparta Rotterdam in the second leg of the promotion play-off finals, after the first leg had ended in a 2–2 draw. Shortly afterwards, head coach Harry van den Ham announces that he would leave the club to join FC Utrecht's managing staff. In the Eredivisie, Dordrecht won their first match against SC Heerenveen, but suffered relegation in the last matchday after Go Ahead Eagles won the away match against Feyenoord. Chairman Ad Heijsman stepped down at the end of March 2015, and supermarket manager Cees van der Poel took over. After relegation of 2015, almost all regular starters had left. An almost completely new team was brought in, including talented players from other Dutch clubs such as Alvin Daniels, Jeroen Lumu and Jafar Arias, but experience was also gained in the form of Geert Arend Roorda.

Eerste Divisie since 2015
Back in the Eerste Divisie for the 2015–16 season, the club finished in a disappointing 14th place. The following season, a whole new squad was put together after the departure of many players. Halfway through the season, it became clear that it could be an even more disappointing year than the last. Dordrecht was at the bottom of the league and faced the risk of relegation to the third-tier Tweede Divisie, as this was possible in the 2016–17 season unlike before. Just before the end of the season, there was a matchup between the bottom two clubs in Achilles '29 and Dordrecht, which ended in a 2–2 draw, leaving the latter in 19th place and safe from relegation. Achilles '29 were later deducted points were for their financial problems, so that Dordrecht was finally safe and could continue their professional football operations.

A large number of players were signed again ahead of the 2017–18 season, and it soon became apparent that Dordrecht would bounce back from a disappointing previous season. The club did not play well in the first half of the season, but after the winter break, the team accomplished a strong winning streak. This ensured that Dordrecht became period champion on 12 March 2018 after a 1–0 win over RKC Waalwijk. Thereby, the club qualified for the promotion play-offs for the Eredivisie. In the play-offs. Dordrecht faced SC Cambuur in the first round. In the home game, they lost 1–4 loss, but in the return, Dordrecht put down a strong performance and ended up winning 1–4 in Leeuwarden to eventually advance after the penalty shootout. Sparta Rotterdam awaited in the semi-finals of the play-offs. The first game at home was lost 1–2, and in the return match at Het Kasteel, Dordrecht were up 0–2 in the first half; enough to reach the final, but lost their lead in the second half as the match ended 2–2. This ended their promotion run and Dordrecht remained in the second tier.

The club introduced a new policy of signing players on longer contracts ahead of the 2018–19 season, which meant that other clubs would have to put down larger transfer fees to convince Dordrecht to sell. However, like the previous season, Dordrecht started the competition poorly and were in last place in mid-November. As a result, head coach Gérard de Nooijer was fired. After assistant Scott Calderwood took over as caretaker until the winter break, and subsequently left the club, Cláudio Braga was appointed the new head coach. Dordrecht also entered into partnerships with Feyenoord and English club Norwich City. In the winter break, the squad received a quality boost with the arrival of Joël Zwarts, Crysencio Summerville and Jari Schuurman, among others. The latter even signed a three-year permanent contract with the Schapekoppen. Under the new coach and with a squad strengthened by new loanees, Dordrecht performed better in the second half of the season, among others beating eventual champions FC Twente. Dordrecht finished the competition in seventeenth place and started the following season with a number of new loanees on the books.

Honours

League 
KNVB Cup
 Winners (2): 1914, 1932
Runners-up (2): 1913, 1943

Eerste Divisie
 Winners (2): 1982–83, 1993–94
Play-off promotion (2): 1986–87, 2013–14

Results

Domestic results
Below is a table with FC Dordrecht's domestic results since the introduction of professional football in 1956.

Club Officials

Current squad

References

External links

Official website
FC Dordrecht forum
Fansite

 
Football clubs in the Netherlands
Association football clubs established in 1883
1883 establishments in the Netherlands
Football clubs in Dordrecht